Promegatherium ("before Megatherium") is a genus of prehistoric xenarthrans that lived in Argentina, during the Late Miocene. This genus is regarded as closely related to the later, and more famous genus, Megatherium, hence the reference in the name. The first specimens of Promegatherium were originally described by the biologist Florentino Ameghino in 1887. 

Fossils of Promegatherium have been found in the Ituzaingó Formation in Argentina.

References

Further reading 
 Family tree of Megatheriidae
 M. C. McKenna & S. K. Bell (eds.) (1997): Classification of mammals, above the species level. New York: Columbia University Press.

Prehistoric placental genera
Prehistoric sloths
Miocene xenarthrans
Miocene genus extinctions
Miocene mammals of South America
Huayquerian
Neogene Argentina
Fossils of Argentina
Ituzaingó Formation
Fossil taxa described in 1887
Taxa named by Florentino Ameghino